Luzula pilosa is a species of flowering plant in the rush family Juncaceae with the common name hairy wood-rush. The plant is native to northern Europe and western Asia.

Description
Luzula pilosa is a short, tufted, grass-like perennial herb. The leaves are blunt, about 4mm wide, the leaf margins fringed with long fine hairs. In North America the common name "hairy wood rush" is given to a similar but different species, Luzula acuminata.

Distribution
It prefers moist but well-drained, somewhat acidic soils, but is not confined to them. It avoids competition, and in lowland locations occurs among leaf litter or moss. It is native to Europe and western Asia. The geographical distribution of the native range includes the British Isles, northern Europe, largely avoiding the Mediterranean, and north-western Asia. It also occurs in the Caucasus.

References

External links
USDA Plants profile of Luzula acuminata ssp. acuminata (hairy woodrush)
Ontario Grasses.com: Luzula pilosa

pilosa
Flora of Eastern Canada
Flora of the Northeastern United States
Flora of Western Canada
Flora of the Appalachian Mountains
Flora of the Great Lakes region (North America)
Plants described in 1753
Taxa named by Carl Linnaeus
Flora of Northern Europe
Flora of Western Asia
Flora without expected TNC conservation status